Olaf Schubert (real name Michael Haubold, born November 7, 1967 in Plauen) is a German comedian and musician.

Life 
Schubert works as comedian and musician on German broadcasters and radios.

Discography by Olaf Schubert 
 Bestandsaufnahme – Songs after Die Wende (1991)
 Hier bin ich! (1995)
 Gefühl gewinnt! (1996)
 Ich bereue nichts! (1998)
 Bestandsaufnahme (1999)
 Echte Menschen (2000)
 Boykott (DVD, 2003)
 Ich bin bei dir (2007)
 Ich bin bei euch (DVD, 2009)
 Meine Kämpfe (CD, 2009)
 Meine Kämpfe (DVD, 2012)
 So! (CD, 2013)
 So! (DVD, 2014)

Hörspiele 
 Die 17 besten Hördialoge (1998)
 In Verbalgewittern (2002)
 Meisterwerke selbstgemacht (2005)
 Olaf Schubert packt ein (2008)
 Komplette Fragmente (2009)

Gabi Schubert 
& die Original Elbtaler
 Ich bin wieder da (2001)

Comedy Awards 
 2004 Salzburger Stier
 2004 St. Ingberter Pfanne
 2005 Thüringer Kleinkunstpreis
 2006 Das große Kleinkunstfestival – Berlin-Award
 2008 Deutscher Comedypreis in category Best newcomer
 2009 Deutscher Comedypreis as member of heute-show (Best comedyshow)
 2010 Deutscher Fernsehpreis as member of heute-show (Comedy)
 2010 Deutscher Kleinkunstpreis 
 2010 Deutscher Comedypreis as member of heute-show (Best comedyshow)
 2011 Deutscher Comedypreis as member of heute-show (Best comedyshow)
 2012 Deutscher Comedypreis as member of heute-show (Best comedyshow)
 2013 Deutscher Comedypreis in category Best comedian
 2014 Deutscher Fernsehpreis as member of heute-show (Comedy)
 2014 Bambi as member of heute-show (Comedy)

External links 

 Official website

References 

1967 births
Living people
People from Plauen
People from Bezirk Karl-Marx-Stadt
German male comedians
German male musicians
ZDF people